Perfluoropropionic acid (PFPrA) or pentafluoropropionic acid is the perfluoroalkyl carboxylic acid with the formula CF3CF2CO2H.  It is a colorless liquid that is strongly acidic and soluble in water and polar organic solvents.

A convenient, safe method for generating tetrafluoroethylene is the pyrolysis of the sodium salt of pentafluoropropionic acid:
C2F5CO2Na  →   C2F4  +  CO2  +  NaF

References

Perfluorocarboxylic acids